Murphy is an unincorporated community in Josephine County, Oregon, United States.  The Three Rivers School District is located there.

Although Murphy is unincorporated, it has a post office with ZIP code 97533.

The first industrial hemp crop in the state was planted near Murphy. In September 2015, deer ate over 900 of the 1000 plants.

References 

Unincorporated communities in Josephine County, Oregon
Unincorporated communities in Oregon